Cocula may refer to several different places in Mexico:
 Cocula, Jalisco, a municipality and municipal seat
 Cocula, Guerrero, a municipality and municipal seat